In IUPAC nomenclature of chemistry, a pendant group (sometimes spelled pendent) or side group is a group of atoms attached to a backbone chain of a long molecule, usually a polymer. Pendant groups are different from pendant chains, as they are neither oligomeric nor polymeric.

For example, the phenyl groups are the pendant groups on a polystyrene chain.

Large, bulky pendant groups such as adamantyl usually raise the glass transition temperature of a polymer by preventing the chains from sliding past each other easily.

References

Organic chemistry